Bulgarians may refer to:

 Ethnic Bulgarians
 Citizens of Bulgaria, a country in the Balkans in Southern Europe
 Bulgarian diaspora - Bulgarians emigrants and their descendants, and also minorities of Bulgarians

See also
Lists of Bulgarians